Red is a series of American action comedy films inspired by the limited comic-book series of the same name created by Warren Ellis and Cully Hamner, and published by the DC Comics imprint Homage. The film stars Bruce Willis, Morgan Freeman, John Malkovich, Mary-Louise Parker, Helen Mirren, and Karl Urban with German film director Robert Schwentke directing a screenplay by brothers Jon and Erich Hoeber.

In the film version, the title is derived from the designation of the status of agent Frank Moses (Willis), meaning "Retired, Extremely Dangerous". The first film, Red, was released on October 15, 2010. A sequel, Red 2, was released on July 19, 2013. In May 2013, Lionsgate re-signed Jon Hoeber and Erich Hoeber to write a third installment.

In August 2015, NBC announced that they were developing a Red television series with the Hoeber brothers, Lorenzo di Bonaventura, and Mark Vahradian.

Comic books

Films

Television
In August 2015, NBC announced that they were developing a Red television series with the Hoeber brothers, Lorenzo di Bonaventura, and Mark Vahradian.

Cast and crew

Cast

Additional crew and production details

Reception

Box office performance

Critical reaction

See also
Outline of James Bond

References

External links
 

Red
Lionsgate franchises
Film series introduced in 2010
Action film series
American film series
Comedy film series
DC Comics franchises